Fabien Debec (born 18 January 1976 in France) is a French retired footballer who played as a goalkeeper for Coventry City in the English First Division (second tier) and for multiple teams in his home country.

Debec now works as goalkeeper coach at the Ploufragan youth training center as well as a volunteer for FC Lamballe.

References

External links 
 Fabien stakes City claim 
 Debec's chance to shine 
 Macca backs blunder keeper
 Not so Fab for Debec 
 FOOTBALL: Iron fist in a velvet goalkeeper's glove 
 FOOTBALL: Jay joy saves day for Debec; BOTHROYD TO THE RESCUE AFTER KEEPER'S HOWLER MAKES LIFE HARD FOR GARY McALLISTER'S SKY BLUES 
 Football: FABIEN'S DEBEC-LE PUNISHED BY PABLO; IPSWICH.......................2 COVENTRY....................1 
 Le Télégramme Tag
 DH. Langueux - Saint-Brieuc, dimanche Debec : le pro est prêt
 
 Foot National Profile
 
 

French expatriate footballers
Living people
1976 births
Coventry City F.C. players
Stade Rennais F.C. players
Grenoble Foot 38 players
AS Cannes players
SC Toulon players
French footballers
Association football goalkeepers
Expatriate footballers in England
AS Saint-Étienne players
LB Châteauroux players
Olympique Lyonnais players